This is a list of years in Iran.


The Islamic Republic of Iran (1979–present) 

This is a list of years in Iran during the Islamic Republic of Iran.

The Imperial State of Iran (1935–1979) 
This is a list of years in Iran during the Imperial State of Iran.

The Imperial State of Persia (1925–1935) 
This is a list of years in Persia during the Imperial State of Persia.

Persia during the Qajar dynasty (1796–1925) 
This is a list of years in Persia during the Qajar dynasty.

See also
 Timeline of Iranian history
 List of Islamic years
 History of Iran

Cities in Iran:
 Timeline of Shiraz
 Timeline of Tehran
 Timeline of Tabriz

 
Iran history-related lists
Iran